Le Sud-Ouest is a borough (arrondissement) of the city of Montreal, Quebec, Canada.

Geography

Le Sud-Ouest is an amalgam of several neighbourhoods with highly distinct histories and identities, mainly with working-class and industrial origins, grouped around the Lachine Canal. These include Saint-Henri, Little Burgundy, and Griffintown to the north of the canal, and Ville-Émard, Côte-Saint-Paul, and Pointe-Saint-Charles to the south.

Located southwest of downtown Montreal (hence the name), the borough is bordered to the northwest by Côte-des-Neiges—Notre-Dame-de-Grâce, to the northeast by the Ville-Marie borough, to the south by the borough of Verdun, to the west by the borough of LaSalle and the town of Montreal West, and to the north by the city of Westmount. The Saint Lawrence River is located upon part of its eastern edge.

History

See History of Saint-Henri, History of Little Burgundy, History of Ville-Émard, History of Côte-Saint-Paul, and History of Pointe-Saint-Charles.

Originally devoted to agriculture, the various municipalities and districts of the Sud-Ouest underwent rapid industrialization following the opening of the Lachine Canal in 1825, becoming the cradle of Canadian industry thanks to both the transportation and the water power offered by the canal. The Canadian National Railway and Grand Trunk Railway also came through Saint-Henri and Pointe-Saint-Charles. The area became a stronghold of the working class, often in difficult conditions such as those described in Gabrielle Roy's The Tin Flute, set in Saint-Henri.

The areas of the borough had highly specific identities. The western part of the borough - Saint-Henri, Ville-Émard, and Côte-Saint-Paul - were chiefly French Canadian, while Pointe-Saint-Charles and Griffintown were considered the seat of Irish culture in Montreal, with street names such as Hibernia and St. Patrick testifying to it. Starting in 1887, a large English-speaking Black community arose in Little Burgundy, attracted from the United States, other parts of Canada, and the Caribbean by jobs in the railways whose stations lay nearby; the area became famed for musical figures such as Oscar Peterson.

The city of Montreal annexed the town of Saint-Henri in 1905, Sainte-Cunégonde (Little Burgundy) in 1906, and Côte-Saint-Paul and Ville-Émard in 1910."L'Histoire du quartier en quelques mots."  ville-emard.com. Accessed 4 July 2011.
 
However, with vessels constantly growing and finally exceeding the capacity of the canal, the coming of the St. Lawrence Seaway in 1956 and the closure of the Lachine Canal in 1970 put an end to the area's industrial prosperity. Population fell sharply and conditions became still more difficult. Projects such as the Décarie Expressway, Turcot Interchange, Bonaventure Expressway, and Expo '67 destroyed entire neighbourhoods, such as Goose Village and part of Côte-Saint-Paul. However, community mobilization preserved the area's social fabric; in particular, the Pointe-Saint-Charles Community Clinic became the model for the CLSC system now used throughout the province.

The reorganization of Montreal in 2002 following the municipal mergers saw the creation of the borough council system, and accordingly, the creation of the borough of Le Sud-Ouest. The borough council met in several temporary locations, including the Marie Uguay cultural centre in Ville-Émard, before the inauguration of the current borough hall in a repurposed factory in Saint-Henri.

Today, Le Sud-Ouest is undergoing an economic and social renaissance, stimulated by the reclamation of the canal for recreation in 2002; businesses opened up and numerous factories were converted into lofts and condominiums. This revival is bringing its own pressures, however, as gentrification increases property taxes and costs of living on the many low-income residents and puts pressure on the availability of low-income housing. The pending reconstruction of the Turcot Interchange and its impact on local residents is a major political issue in the borough.

Government

Municipal

The borough is divided into two municipal electoral districts:

Saint-Paul–Émard–Saint-Henri-Ouest
Saint-Henri-Est–Petite-Bourgogne–Pointe-Saint-Charles–Griffintown

The composition of the borough council remained unchanged following the 2017 municipal election, and consists of the following councillors:

Provincial
The bulk of the borough constitutes the provincial electoral district of Saint-Henri–Sainte-Anne; the industrial and railway area in the northeast is in the district of Notre-Dame-de-Grâce.

Federal
The borough is divided among the following federal ridings:

Ville-Marie—Le Sud-Ouest—Île-des-Sœurs (Saint-Henri, Pointe-Saint-Charles, Little Burgundy, Griffintown, part of Côte-Saint-Paul)
LaSalle—Émard—Verdun (Ville-Émard, part of Côte-Saint-Paul)

Demographics

Infrastructure

Transport

The borough is served by the green and orange lines of the Montreal Metro, including Place-Saint-Henri, Lionel-Groulx, Charlevoix, Angrignon, Georges-Vanier, Monk, and Jolicoeur stations.

The borough is traversed and partly delimited by Quebec Autoroutes 15 (Décarie Aut.) and 20 (Ville-Marie Aut.); Autoroute 10 (Bonaventure Aut.) also passes through it. The Montreal ends of the Champlain Bridge and Victoria Bridge lie in Le Sud-Ouest, as does the Turcot Interchange (autoroutes 15 and 20), Quebec's largest highway interchange. The CN rail lines exiting Central Station pass through the borough.

Major thoroughfares include Notre Dame St., Laurendeau St., St. Patrick St., La Vérendrye Blvd., De l'Église St., Monk Blvd., Centre St., Charlevoix St., Wellington St., Atwater Ave., and Guy St.

The Lachine Canal is crossed by the Boul. Monk, Rue Charlevoix, Rue des Seigneurs, and Rue Wellington bridges and by the Saint Rémi and Atwater tunnels.

Bicycle paths run along the Lachine Canal, through the Parc du Premier-Chemin-de-Fer and Rue Lionel-Groulx, and through Pointe-Saint-Charles. Pedestrian- and cyclist-only bridges across the canal are located at the Saint-Gabriel Locks, the Atwater Market, Gédéon de Catalogne Park (rue Beaudoin), and Rue de l'Église.

Culture and recreation

The two largest green spaces in the borough are the Lachine Canal and its recreational facilities (including the Lachine Canal National Historic Site of Canada), and Angrignon Park in Ville-Émard. Other important parks include Ignace Bourget Park (Ville-Émard), Sir George-Étienne Cartier Square and Saint-Henri Park (Saint-Henri), Vinet Park and Oscar Peterson Park (Little Burgundy), and Saint-Gabriel Park, Marguerite Bourgeoys Park, and Le Ber Park (Pointe-Saint-Charles).

The borough boasts numerous historic buildings, such as the Maison Saint-Gabriel (built in 1698), the former Negro Community Centre, the Atwater Market, Union United Church, Corona Theatre, the Atwater pumping station, the Saint-Henri fire hall, and the area's churches. In Saint-Henri, the Musée des ondes Emile Berliner tells the story of the radio and phonograph industry in the historic RCA Victor building.

The borough's community centres include the Centre Saint-Zotique, the Centre d'éducation populaire (CEDA), Tyndale-St. George's Community Centre, Maison Saint-Charles, and Centre Monseigneur-Pigeon. It is served by four libraries: Marie-Uguay, Saint-Henri, Georges-Vanier, and Saint-Charles. Sporting facilities include the Complexe récréatif Gadbois, one of the largest on the island, as well as the Piscine Émard, Piscine Saint-Henri, Centre sportif de la Petite-Bourgogne, and Piscine Saint-Charles.

Institutions

The territory of Le Sud-Ouest is served by the Centre de santé et des services sociaux du Sud-Ouest–Verdun, which operates the CLSCs Saint-Henri and Ville-Émard–Côte-Saint-Paul. The Clinique communautaire Pointe-Saint-Charles, though it inspired the CLSC system and is the provider of CLSC services for Pointe-Saint-Charles, continues to operate independently of the CLSC system. The nearest hospitals are the Hôpital de Verdun, Hôpital de LaSalle and the McGill University Health Centre superhospital is immediately northwest of the borough.

Centre Sportif de la Petite-Bourgogne

The Little Burgundy Sports Center features a multitude of activities and spaces to accommodate a large audience. This large facility is very much involved in community life and contributes to the dynamism of Little Burgundy and the Southwest district. Its elegant and contemporary architecture makes it a true landmark in this part of Montreal.

Opened in 1997, this beautiful building was built at a cost of $8.6 million by neighborhood residents striving to overcome the lack of activities and sports facilities in the area.

Its funding was arranged by three parties: the federal and provincial governments have contributed $4 million and the City of Montreal invested $4.6 million.

During the opening, the Mayor Pierre Bourque officially transferred the facility and equipment management to the Little Burgundy Sports Center Corporation, chaired at the time by Mrs. Léonie Charles.

Managed independently, the Little Burgundy Sport Center is represented by the board of directors and a management team that works in partnership with the South West district, City of Montreal.

Commerce

Major commercial streets include Boulevard Monk (Ville-Émard), Avenue de l'Église (Côte Saint-Paul), Rue du Centre (Pointe-Saint-Charles), and Rue Notre-Dame (Saint-Henri and Little Burgundy). Rue Notre-Dame in Little Burgundy is notable as a centre for antiques dealers.

The Atwater Market, is located beside the Lachine Canal. Joe Beef Restaurant is on Notre Dame Street West in Little Burgundy.

Education

The Commission scolaire de Montréal'' (CSDM) operates Francophone public schools.

The English Montreal School Board (EMSB) operates Anglophone public schools.

The Montreal Public Libraries Network operates four libraries: Georges-Vanier, Marie-Uguay, Saint-Charles, and Saint-Henri.

The borough is home to the École de technologie supérieure technical university.

Bibliothèque Georges-Vanier

This library, more than 100 years old, was the first French-language public library erected in Canada and is the oldest branch still in operation in the city. It was forced to close in 1918 after the First World War for budget reasons, but in 1947, thanks to the determination of Georges Vanier, it reopened as the Workman library.

See also

 Boroughs of Montreal
 Districts of Montreal
 Griffintown
 Municipal reorganization in Quebec

References

External links
 
 City of Montreal. Le Sud-Ouest (in French)
 IMTL. Historical buildings and skyscrapers in Sud-Ouest borough

 
Boroughs of Montreal
Irish-Canadian culture in Montreal
Gentrification in Canada